Di Zijian (born 27 February 2001) is Chinese badminton player. Born in Liaoyang, Liaoning, he started practicing badminton at the age of 10 and entered the Liaoning team when he was 14. Di was selected to join the national youth team in 2017, then became the national second team players at the beginning of 2018. He was two times boys' doubles gold medalists at the Asian Junior Championships in 2017 and 2018, also won the mixed team title with the national junior team in 2018. At the World Junior Championships, he helped the team clinch the gold medal in 2017 and 2018, and won the silver medals in the boys' doubles event in 2017 and 2019. He also showed his achievement in the senior tournament level by reaching the final at the 2018 Lingshui China Masters and finished as the runner-up in the men's doubles event. Di won his first BWF World Tour title in 2019 SaarLorLux Open.

Achievements

World Junior Championships 
Boys' doubles

Asian Junior Championships 
Boys' doubles

BWF World Tour (1 title, 1 runner-up) 
The BWF World Tour, which was announced on 19 March 2017 and implemented in 2018, is a series of elite badminton tournaments sanctioned by the Badminton World Federation (BWF). The BWF World Tours are divided into levels of World Tour Finals, Super 1000, Super 750, Super 500, Super 300 (part of the HSBC World Tour), and the BWF Tour Super 100.

Men's doubles

References

External links 
 

2001 births
Living people
Sportspeople from Liaoyang
Badminton players from Liaoning
Chinese male badminton players